Bolshaya Sludka is a rural locality (a village) and the administrative center of Belosludskoye Rural Settlement of Krasnoborsky District, Arkhangelsk Oblast, Russia. The population was 517 as of 2010.

Geography 
Bolshaya Sludka is located 16 km northeast of Krasnoborsk (the district's administrative centre) by road. Tolsha 1-ya is the nearest rural locality.

References 

Rural localities in Krasnoborsky District